Leif Hans Mevik (22 January 1930 – 13 October 2015) was a Norwegian diplomat.

He was born in Gildeskål, and was a cand.philol. by education. He started working for the Norwegian Ministry of Foreign Affairs in 1961. He served as the Norwegian ambassador to OSCE in Vienna from 1980 to 1988, to Spain from 1988 to 1992 and to NATO in Brussels from 1992 to 1997. Mevik received an honorary doctorate from California Lutheran University in 1988.

References

1930 births
2015 deaths
People from Gildeskål
Norwegian civil servants
Norwegian expatriates in Austria
Ambassadors of Norway to Spain
Permanent Representatives of Norway to NATO